Alan Chin may refer to:

 Alan Chin (artist) (born 1987), contemporary American artist
 Alan Chin (photographer) ( 1996–2008), American photo-journalist